Guénin is a commune in the Morbihan department of Brittany in north-western France.

Geography
The River Ével flows southwestwards through the middle of the commune and forms its south-western border.

Demographics
The inhabitants of Guénin are called in French Guéninois.

See also
Communes of the Morbihan department

References

External links

 Cultural Heritage 
 Mayors of Morbihan Association 

Communes of Morbihan